Mandisha Ann-Marie Thomas (born February 11, 1975) is an American politician from Georgia. Thomas is a Democrat member of Georgia House of Representatives for District 65.

References

Democratic Party members of the Georgia House of Representatives
21st-century American politicians
Living people
21st-century American women politicians
African-American state legislators in Georgia (U.S. state)
Women state legislators in Georgia (U.S. state)
21st-century African-American women
21st-century African-American politicians
1975 births